Sabina Fuchs (born on 4 May 1970) is a Swiss sport shooter. She competed in rifle shooting events at the 1992 Summer Olympics and the 1996 Summer Olympics.

Olympic results

References

1970 births
Living people
ISSF rifle shooters
Swiss female sport shooters
Shooters at the 1992 Summer Olympics
Shooters at the 1996 Summer Olympics
Olympic shooters of Switzerland